= Segmentia =

Finnish musical group

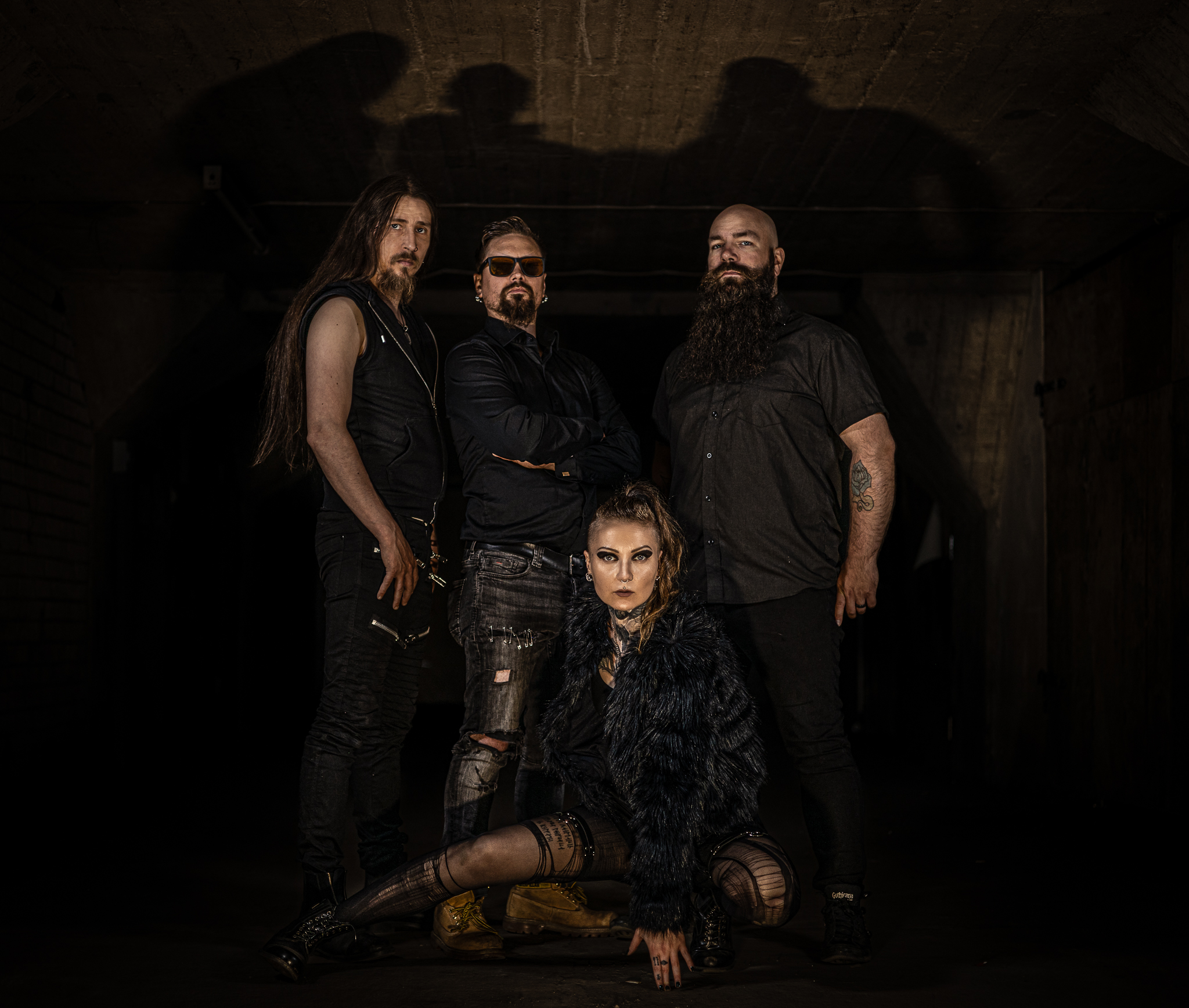
- Segmentia

Background information
- Origin: Seinäjoki, Finland
- Genres: Melancholic metal; alternative metal
- Years active: 2019–present
- Label: Sodeh Records
- Members: KANSANOJA - Vocals; Manu Lenkkeri - Guitars; Stefan Laine - Bass; Jere Luokkamäki - Drums
- Website: segmentia.net

Segmentia is a melancholic metal band from Seinäjoki, Finland, founded in 2019. The band consists of vocalist KANSANOJA, guitarist Manu Lenkkeri, bassist Stefan Laine, and drummer Jere Luokkamäki.

Segmentia began to form in 2012, after an initial project as a cover band. The band went through various name iterations, lineup changes, and development of their own sound before being established as Segmentia. In 2019, they released their first album, "Shanghai," under the original band lineup featuring vocalist Laura Morgan. After Morgan left the band in 2020, Kansana joined as the new vocalist, which was officially showcased with a live performance of the "Shanghai" EP in 2021.

The band has since released its second album "Alone" in 2023.

== Musical style and influences ==
The musical style of Segmentia has been described as an aggregation of several musical styles including Pop, Metal, and Rock music. Composer and lyricist Jere Luokkamäki cites the genre influences as "segments" in the band's signature sound.

== Releases ==
=== EP ===
- Shanghai EP (2019)
- Shanghai (Live 2021) (2022)
- Alone EP (2023)

=== Singles ===
- Before The Dawn (2026)
- Forget Me (2022)
- Alone (2022)
- Save Me (2022)
